Alla Tumanian (also Tumanyan; ; born March 17, 1950) is an Armenian-American theatre and film actress.

Biography 
Tumanian was born in 1950 in Yerevan, Soviet Union. In 1971, she graduated from the Yerevan State Institute of Theater and Fine Arts, the Faculty of acting. 1971-1990 she worked at  Sundukyan State Academic Theatre of Yerevan, 1990-1991 at "Metro" theatre.

Selected filmography

TV Series

References

External links

Alla Tumanian at kino-teatr.ru
ԲԱՆԱՁԵՎ. Ալլա Թումանյան մաս 1-ին 
ԲԱՆԱՁԵՎ. Ալլա Թումանյան մաս 2-րդ 

1950s births
Living people
Soviet Armenians
Armenian actresses
Armenian emigrants to the United States